NGC 1245 is an open cluster in the constellation Perseus. It was discovered by William Herschel in 11 December 1786. It is located 3° southwest of alpha Persei and can be spotted with 10x50 binoculars. The cluster is nearly 1 billion years old. NGC 1245 has about 200 members the brightest of which are of 12th magnitude. The cluster shows evidence of mass segregation and it is possible that it has lost its lower mass members. Lying at a distance of 3kpc, the cluster is estimated to be 27 light years across.

References

External links 
 

1245
Perseus (constellation)
Open clusters